Canal 13 is a Chilean free-to-air television channel. It was launched on 21 August 1959, on VHF channel 2 of Santiago, in a broadcast led by a group of engineers from the Pontifical Catholic University of Chile. Subsequently, the TV station moved its frequency to VHF channel 13, which gave rise to its current name. In its beginnings, one of its most important milestones was the broadcast of the 1962 FIFA World Cup, held in Chile.

Owned by the Luksic Group, Canal 13 is the second oldest television station in Chile. It was named Corporación de Televisión de la Pontificia Universidad Católica de Chile (Television Corporation of the Pontifical Catholic University of Chile) until 2010. However, the station is known in Chile as El 13 (the thirteenth) since its inception.

Its central studios are located in the Eleodoro Rodríguez Matte Television Centre, which houses the channel's production and broadcast facilities since the 1980s. The complex is located in Providencia, Santiago Metropolitan Region and has 5 hectares of infrastructure. Since 1998, these dependencies have been named after the station's deceased executive director, Eleodoro Rodríguez Matte, who was one of the longest-serving men in this position.

Other Services 

Channel 13 also controls 3 sister channels, 4 radio stations via 13 Radios (see section below) and 2 free online streaming services.

Sister channels 
13C: formerly called "Canal 13 Cable". Its programming is focused towards cultural-themed series.
Canal 13 HD: it was the first HD channel in the country and one of the first of its kind in Latin America. It was launched in 2009 and it is currently treated as Channel 13's main feed, airing most of its content in high-definition.
Rec TV: Channel 13's cable network which broadcasts older programs. Available through Cable TV and online.
T13 Móvil: Teletrece's own mobile radio network available online. It is also available on Channel 13.2, where it is named Canal 13.2.

Regional networks 
Channel 13 also had regional stations that broadcast local news. However, as the years passed, they were closed as the main signal began reaching those specific regions.
Canal 13 Valparaíso: Channel 13's television affiliate from the Valparaíso Region. Closed in 2019.
Canal 13 Concepción: Channel 13's television affiliate from the Bío Bío Region. It initially worked between 1973 and 1996, but was relaunched in 2004 until it closed in 2019.
Canal 13 Antofagasta: Channel 13's television affiliate from the Antofagasta Region. It worked between 2004 and 2009. One side fact is that it initially replaced Channel 13's affiliation with local TV station Telenorte.
Canal 13 Temuco: Channel 13's television affiliate from the Araucanía Region. Closed in 2009 alongside Canal 13 Antofagasta.

Online services 

 13Now: Channel 13's TV streaming service, which contains various contents including previous programs made by the station. It is available online and on Samsung Smart TVs sold locally since 2016. It was launched in 2017 as Loop 13, but renamed in 2019 to the current name.
 Emisor Podcasting: Channel 13's podcasting service, with a catalog of various podcasts made by 13 Radio's program hosts. It is available online since 2019, and has a mobile app on both iOS and Android.

13 Radios

Channel 13 also has a radio brand known as 13 Radios, founded in 2013. It has the following 4 stations: 
Oasis FM: radio station purchased by Channel 13, only available in Santiago and the southern half of the country. It airs programming designed for young adults. It is available for all Chile via Cable TV, on VTR's Channel 654.
Play FM: radio station airing English-language mainstream pop music. It also airs Spanish-language music but not as frequently. Its broadcasts on the 100.9 FM band in Santiago. Its programming is based on Pop, Rock, Soul, Blues and R&B music styles.
Sonar FM: local radio station that broadcasts Rock and Hard rock music. It is only available in Santiago. Its programming is based on the Rock music style.
Tele13 Radio: local news radio station which is part of the News Department of the channel. Its name comes from Channel 13's newscast, Teletrece (which is often abbreviated to Tele13). Began operations on April 21, 2015, replacing Top FM.

Previous stations 

 Radio Horizonte: former radio station on the 103.3 FM dial, born in 1985 and purchased by Channel 13 in 2012. Its programming was based on Indie and Electronic songs. It was replaced by Top FM (current Tele13 Radio) on 19 March 2013, but it still worked online until May 2017. On 31 March 2021 Returned Via Internet.
 Top FM: former radio station by Channel 13, that had programming created for young to old adults between 17 to 45 years. It replaced Radio Horizonte on the 103.3 FM dial, but ended regular broadcasts on 20 April 2015, being replaced with Tele13 Radio the following day. Like Horizonte, Top FM was still available online until May 2017.

Digital terrestrial television

Logos

Corporate slogans

Programming

Teletrece editions

Current own programming

Former programming

See also
 Cubox
 List of Chilean television channels

External links
 Official Site

References

 
Television networks in Chile
Television stations in Chile
Television channels and stations established in 1959
Spanish-language television stations
1959 establishments in Chile
Companies based in Santiago